Ushenin is a Russian masculine surname, its feminine counterpart is Ushenina. Notable people with the surname include:

Andrei Ushenin (born 1983), Russian footballer
Anna Ushenina (born 1985), Ukrainian chess grandmaster

Russian-language surnames